Scopula nigricosta, described by Louis Beethoven Prout in 1916, is a moth of the family Geometridae. It is found in Malawi.

Taxonomy
Scopula nigricosta is a junior secondary homonym of Synelys nigricosta described by Paul Dognin in 1911 and requires a replacement name.

References

Endemic fauna of Malawi
Moths described in 1916
nigricosta
Lepidoptera of Malawi
Moths of Sub-Saharan Africa